Daniel Ambrose (1843 – 17 December 1895) was a medical practitioner and an Irish nationalist politician and Member of Parliament (MP) in the House of Commons of the United Kingdom of Great Britain and Ireland. He was born in Loughill Co Limerick and his parents were Stephen Ambrose, from Ardagh and Margaret Kennedy from Adare.

He was elected as an Irish National Federation (Anti-Parnellite) MP for the South Louth constituency at the 1892 general election. He was re-elected at the 1895 general election, but died in office in December 1895. The by-election for his seat was won by the Anti-Parnellite Richard McGhee.

His cousin, Robert Ambrose, also served as an Anti-Parnellite MP.

References

External links

1843 births
1895 deaths
Anti-Parnellite MPs
Members of the Parliament of the United Kingdom for County Louth constituencies (1801–1922)
UK MPs 1892–1895
UK MPs 1895–1900